Kakawa-Kolonia  is a village in the administrative district of Gmina Godziesze Wielkie, within Kalisz County, Greater Poland Voivodeship, in west-central Poland.

The village has a population of 250.

References

Kakawa-Kolonia